Catocala separata is a moth of the family Erebidae first described by Christian Friedrich Freyer in 1846. It is found in the Balkans, the Mediterranean part of southern Turkey and the Levant.

There is one generation per year. Adults are on wing from May to July.

The larvae probably feed on Quercus species.

References

External links

Image

separata
Moths described in 1846
Moths of Europe
Moths of the Middle East